The Slovenia national football B team is a secondary football team that serves as a support for the Slovenia national team and is controlled by the Football Association of Slovenia, the governing body for football in Slovenia.

Results

2000s

2010s

Players

2019 squad
The following players were called up for the friendly match against China U25, on 24 January 2019.
Players in bold have played at least one full international match with the Slovenian senior team before the match against China U25.
Clubs listed are correct as of 24 January 2019, when the match took place.

Head-to-head record

See also

Slovenia national football team
Slovenia national under-21 football team
Slovenia national under-19 football team
Slovenia national under-17 football team
Sport in Slovenia

References

External links
 

B team
European national B association football teams
Football in Slovenia